Sebastião Artur Cardoso da Gama (10 April 1924 –28  7 February 1952)  was a Portuguese poet.

Biography
Sebastião da Gama got a degree in Roman Philosophy by the Faculty of Letters at the University of Lisbon.

He was professor at the Veiga Beirão Commercial and Industrial School in Lisbon, later in suburban Setúbal at the Commercial Industrial School (now the Escola Secundária Sebastião da Gama) and in Estremoz at the local Commercial and Industrial School, the city where a primary school would be named after him, the modern Basic School (Escola Básica Sebastião da Gama EB2,3 Estremoz).

He published several reviews including Mundo Literário between 1946 and 1948, Árvore and Távola Redonda.

His work was about Serra da Arrábida, where he lived and led an avant garde poetic movement, and the personal tragedy of his eventually fatal tuberculosis.

He made a charter which was sent in August 1947 with other personalities to protect Serra da Arrábida and formed a movement to create the LPN (Liga para a Protecção da Natureza (Natural Protection League) in 1948, the first Portuguese ecologic association. The Arrábida Natural Park was founded in 1976.

In his Diário, edited and published posthumously in 1958, he documented his experiences as a teacher and a made a valuable reflection on teaching.

He died at the age of 27 of renal tuberculosis from which he had suffered since he was a teenager.

The parish administrations of São Lourenço and São Simão, now fully neighborhoods of Setúbal, was honored with his name in the Portuguese National Poetry Award.  On June 1, 1999, Museu Sebastião da Gama was founded in his birthplace and preserves the memories of his work Poeta da Arrábida.  Seven of his poems were featured along with Cape Verdean poems in Poesia de Cabo Verde e Sete Poemas de Sebastião da Gama which was released as part of the Associação Música XXI in June 2007.

Works

Poetry
Serra-Mãe. Lisboa: Portugália Editora, 1945
Loas a Nossa Senhora da Arrábida. Com Miguel Caleiro. Lisboa: Imprensa Artística, 1946
Cabo da Boa Esperança (Cape of Good Hope). Lisboa: Portugália Editora, 1947
Campo Aberto (Shut Camp). Lisboa: Portugália Editora, 1951

Prose
A Região dos Três Castelos. Azeitão: Transportadora Setubalense, 1949.

Posthumous publications
Pelo Sonho é que Vamos, 1953
Diário, 1958
Itinerário Paralelo (Itinerary Parallel), 1967.
Compiled by David Mourão-Ferreira
O Segredo é Amar (Secrets from the Sea), 1969
Cartas I (Charters I), 1994

References

Further reading
Martins, Engrácia da Glória Quintela Alves Sousa Varajão . Educação e Doutrinamento: O pensamento educacional de Sebastião da Gama (pdf) 
Santos, Alexandre Francisco Ferreira dos Sebastião da Gama: milagre de vida em busca do eterno (pdf)

External links
Instituto Camões 
Editorial Presença - Sebastião da Gama - Biography 
http://alfarrabio.di.uminho.pt/vercial/sgama.htm Projecto Vercial] 

20th-century Portuguese poets
1924 births
1952 deaths
People from Setúbal
20th-century deaths from tuberculosis
Portuguese male poets
20th-century male writers
Tuberculosis deaths in Portugal